Vetus Latina ("Old Latin" in Latin), also known as Vetus Itala ("Old Italian"), Itala ("Italian") and Old Italic, and denoted by the siglum , is the collective name given to the Latin translations of biblical texts (both Old Testament and New Testament) that preceded the Vulgate (the Latin translation produced by Jerome in the late 4th century). 

The Vetus Latina translations continued to be used alongside the Vulgate, but eventually the Vulgate became the standard Latin Bible used by the Catholic Church, especially after the Council of Trent (1545–1563) affirmed the Vulgate translation as authoritative for the text of Catholic Bibles. However, the Vetus Latina texts survive in some parts of the liturgy (e.g., the Pater Noster).

As the English translation of Vetus Latina is "Old Latin", they are also sometimes referred to as the Old Latin Bible, although they are written in the form of Latin known as Late Latin, not that known as Old Latin. The Vetus Latina manuscripts that are preserved today are dated from AD 350 to the 13th century.

Text 
There is no single "Vetus Latina Bible". Instead, Vetus Latina is a collection of biblical manuscript texts that are Latin translations of Septuagint and New Testament passages that preceded Jerome's Vulgate.

Old Testament 

Some of the oldest surviving Vetus Latina versions of the Old Testament (or Hebrew Bible, or Tanakh) include the Quedlinburg Itala fragment, a 5th-century manuscript containing parts of 1 Samuel, and the Codex Complutensis I, a 10th-century manuscript containing Old Latin readings of the Book of Ruth, Book of Esther, Book of Tobit, Book of Judith, and 1-2 Maccabees.

New Testament 

After comparing readings for Luke 24:4–5 in Vetus Latina manuscripts, Bruce Metzger counted "at least 27 variant readings in Vetus Latina manuscripts that have survived" for this passage alone.

Replacement
When Jerome undertook the revision of Latin translations of Old Testament texts in the late 4th century, he checked the Septuagint and Vetus Latina translations against the Hebrew texts that were then available. He broke with church tradition and translated most of the Old Testament of his Vulgate from Hebrew sources rather than from the Greek Septuagint. His choice was severely criticized by Augustine, his contemporary; a flood of still less moderate criticism came from those who regarded Jerome as a forger. While on the one hand he argued for the superiority of the Hebrew texts in correcting the Septuagint on both philological and theological grounds, on the other, in the context of accusations of heresy against him, Jerome would acknowledge the Septuagint texts as well.

Comparisons with the Vulgate
Below are some comparisons of the Vetus Latina with text from critical editions of the Vulgate.

The following comparison is of Luke 6:1–4, taken from the Vetus Latina text in the Codex Bezae:

The Vetus Latina text survives in places in the Catholic liturgy, such as the following verse well known from Christmas carols, Luke 2:14:

The Vetus Latina text means, "Glory [belongs] to God among the high, and peace [belongs] to men of good will on earth". The Vulgate text means "Glory [belongs] to God among the most high and peace among men of good will on earth".

Probably the most well known difference between the Vetus Latina and the Vulgate is in the Pater Noster, where the phrase from the Vetus Latina, Panem nostrum cotidianum, "our daily bread", becomes Panem nostrum supersubstantialem, "our supersubstantial bread" in the Vulgate; the Vetus Latina form being retained in the Roman Missal for liturgical use.

See also 
 Latin Psalters
 List of New Testament Latin manuscripts
 Vetus Latina manuscripts

Notes

References

Bibliography

External links 

 The Vetus Latina Institut, Beuron/Germany (former website)
 Vetus Latina – Resources for the study of the Old Latin Bible (in English, German, and Latin)
 Vetus Latina Iohannes – An electronic edition of the manuscripts of John
 The old Latin Acts of the Apostles – About the edition of the Latin versions of the Books of Acts (in German)
 Tanakh.info – Polyglot of the Tanakh featuring the text of Old Latin version of the Old Testament with a new English translation.

 
Early versions of the Bible
Translations into Latin
Christian terminology
Latin-language literature
Catholic bibles
Latin Church